Jorge Armando Barrera Toscano (born February 17, 1982, in Guadalajara) is a Mexican former footballer. He last played for Estudiantes Tecos.

External links
 

1982 births
Living people
Footballers from Guadalajara, Jalisco
Association football defenders
Mexican footballers
C.D. Guadalajara footballers
Querétaro F.C. footballers
Santos Laguna footballers
Chivas USA players
La Piedad footballers
Correcaminos UAT footballers
C.D. Veracruz footballers
Tecos F.C. footballers
Mexican expatriate footballers
Expatriate soccer players in the United States
Mexican expatriate sportspeople in the United States
Liga MX players